Dearest Enemy is a 1989 Australian sitcom about two newlyweds.

A pilot was shot with John Waters and Jacki Weaver. Grigor Taylor and Linden Wilkinson took over for season one in 1989. In season two, made in 1992, Wood replaced Grigor Taylor.

Plot
Two newlyweds have different political views.

Cast
Grigor Taylor as Anderson (1989)
John Wood as Anderson (1992)
Linden Wilkinson as Alex Taylor
Frank Wilson as Walter Taylor
Bruce Spence as Lenny
Vic Hawkins as Simon

Production
Writer Michael Riordan was a teacher whose father Joe was a Housing Minister in the Whitman government. He approached John O'Grady and Geoff Portmann who were the producers of Mother and Son. They shot a pilot in 1987 with Jacki Weaver and John Waters. However neither were able to reprise their roles - Waters had stage commitments and Weaver went into another sitcom, House Rules.

Critical reception was not entirely positive.

However it was decided to revive the show in 1992 with John Wood replacing Taylor.

References

External links
Dearest Enemy at IMDb

Australian Broadcasting Corporation original programming
Australian television sitcoms
1989 Australian television series debuts